Labadie is an unincorporated community in Franklin County, Missouri, United States. It is located approximately three miles north of Gray Summit.

History 
The community is named after Sylvester L'Abaddie, a hunter who (by some accounts) was killed by a bear in nearby Labaddie's Cave. A county history published in 1968, however, records that he "died peacefully in his bed in his 70th year, on July 25, 1849, at his home on Olive Street in St. Louis." Labadie post office was established June 7, 1855. Labaddie Creek enters the Missouri River here, and this was the location of Labaddie Station of the Missouri Pacific Railroad.

Notable Places 
The Bethel Church and James North House are listed on the National Register of Historic Places.

There are three restaurants in Labadie. 

 The Hawthorne Inn was founded in 1994. It is a popular destination for daytrippers from St. Louis, partially due to its presence on Groupon. In March 2001 the restaurant caught fire and was closed for rebuilding until 2002.

 Coal Fire Grill & Tap specializes in BBQ, smoked meats, and pizzas with an extensive selection of draught beer. It is located in the historic Labadie Market building. It offers a rustic, family-friendly atmosphere with locally carved tabletops and bar tops.

 Andy's Cowboy Cookin' is an open-air restaurant serving breakfast on the weekends and pizzas on Thursday nights. Everything is cooked outdoors on a camp stove or in the newly built pizza oven. 

Labadie Energy Center, a coal-fired power plant owned by Ameren, began generation in 1970. In 2019, Ameren was ordered by a federal judge to install equipment at the plant to reduce its carbon emissions. Ameren has also faced backlash from community environmentalist groups due to the coal ash landfill located on the energy center's property.

References

Unincorporated communities in Franklin County, Missouri
Unincorporated communities in Missouri